Pádraic Ó Máille (23 February 1878 – 19 January 1946) was an Irish politician. He was a founder member of Sinn Féin and of the Conradh na Gaeilge in Galway. He was a member of the Irish Volunteers from 1917 to 1921.

He was born in Kilmilkin, in Maam Valley in County Galway and was a farmer. He was elected as a Sinn Féin MP for Galway Connemara at the 1918 general election. 

In January 1919, Sinn Féin MPs who had been elected in the Westminster elections of 1918 refused to recognise the Parliament of the United Kingdom and instead assembled at the Mansion House in Dublin as a revolutionary parliament called Dáil Éireann. He was re-elected as a Sinn Féin Teachta Dála (TD) for the Galway constituency at the 1921 elections.

He supported the Anglo-Irish Treaty and voted in favour of it. He was re-elected as a pro-Treaty Sinn Féin TD for Galway at the 1922 general election, and was elected as a Cumann na nGaedheal TD for Galway at the 1923 general election. In the subsequent Irish Civil War, he was targeted for assassination by anti-Treaty forces and was shot and badly wounded in Dublin in December 1922.

He was critical of the proposed Irish Boundary Commission and resigned from Cumann na nGaedheal and founded a new political party called Clann Éireann in 1926.

He lost his seat at the June 1927 general election and was unsuccessful at the September 1927 general election. He later joined Fianna Fáil (the party which had emerged from the anti-Treaty side in the civil war) and contested the 1932 general election for that party in the Dublin County constituency but was not elected. 

On each of these occasions he was subjected to a smear campaign by his former party colleagues who used his pro-Treaty stance during the civil war against him. It was alleged that he had personally selected his fellow county man Liam Mellows for execution. These smears persisted despite denials from the Mellows family and from Ó Máille himself. In fact, Mellows was executed in reprisal for the attack on Ó Máille and Sean Hales in 1922. Mellows was shot the following day while Ó Máille himself was gravely wounded and in hospital.

He served as a Fianna Fáil Senator in Seanad Éireann from 1934 to 1936. He was re-elected to the new Seanad in 1938 on the Agricultural Panel. From 1939 until his death in 1946 he was re-appointed to the Seanad as a nominee of the Taoiseach Éamon de Valera. He was Leas-Chathaoirleach (deputy chairperson) of the Seanad from May to November 1938.

Sources
Richard Dunphy (1995), The Making of Fianna Fáil Power in Ireland: 1923–48
Michael O'Cuinneagáin (1996), On the Arm of Time

References

1878 births
1946 deaths
People of the Irish Civil War (Pro-Treaty side)
Early Sinn Féin TDs
Cumann na nGaedheal TDs
Fianna Fáil senators
Members of the 1st Dáil
Members of the 2nd Dáil
Members of the 3rd Dáil
Members of the 4th Dáil
Members of the 1934 Seanad
Members of the 2nd Seanad
Members of the 3rd Seanad
Members of the 4th Seanad
Members of the 5th Seanad
Members of the Parliament of the United Kingdom for County Galway constituencies (1801–1922)
UK MPs 1918–1922
Politicians from County Galway
Nominated members of Seanad Éireann